Mighty Planes is a documentary television program produced by and aired on Discovery Channel Canada and also broadcast around the world. Similarly to its sister series Mighty Ships, each episode follows a particular aircraft and provides an insight into what it does.

Mighty Planes is part of Discovery Channel's Mighty series. These include Mighty Ships, Mighty Cruise Ships and Mighty Trains.

The series has aired 4 seasons with 25 episodes in total.

Series overview 

A typical Mighty Planes episode highlights one plane or group of them. Aircraft featured range from the Orbis flying eye hospital to the largest passenger jet ever built, to Air Force aircraft such as the Lockheed C-5 Galaxy. The episodes follow the aircraft while it is on a flight or mission start to finish. Similarly to Mighty Ships, Mighty Planes uses computer-generated animation to show scenes which would not otherwise be doable.

After a lengthy hiatus, the series returned in 2017 with its 4th and most recent season. Mike Goral, who narrated the first 3 seasons of the series, was replaced by Jamie Carr.

Episode

Season 1

Season 2

Season 3

Season 4

Specials

References

External links 
 Official Website 
 
 Mighty Planes on Crave TV

See also
 Mighty Trains
 Mighty Ships

2010s Canadian reality television series
2010s Canadian documentary television series
2012 Canadian television series debuts
2017 Canadian television series endings
Discovery Channel (Canada) original programming